Roque Balaoro Santos (born October 8, 1985), simply known as Rox Santos, is a Filipino songwriter and record producer based in Metro Manila, Philippines. Santos wrote songs and produced albums for various artists, including: Daniel Padilla, Regine Velasquez, Vina Morales, Vice Ganda, Ylona Garcia, Kaye Cal, Toni Gonzaga, Martin Nievera, Juris Fernandez, Erik Santos, Jed Madela, Angeline Quinto, and Jaya.

Early life and education
Rox Santos was born in Manila, with most of his younger years spent in the city of Las Pinas. Rox grew up surrounded by music lovers, with his grandmother and some of his aunts, uncles, and cousins being musicians.

He later studied in Bicol University, the school where her aunt studied music. He graduated college in Bicol University with a bachelor's degree in BS Food Technology, he became a manager at a nutrition lab soon after. It was not until he met his friend and mentor Jonathan Manalo when his career in music began.

Career
Santos started his career in music at Star Music (formerly Star Records) of ABS-CBN as a project coordinator, a position Jonathan encouraged him to apply to. Santos’ earliest project was the soundtrack album “May Bukas Pa: Conversations of Bro & Santino.” It featured songs from and inspired by the television show May Bukas Pa.

He got his big break when ABS-CBN started developing a remake of the Mexican telenovela “Yo Soy Betty La Fea.” He wrote and produced the theme song for the show, with show lead Bea Alonzo performing. Rox's compositions “Hanggang Kailan” performed by Michael Pangilinan (which he co-wrote with fellow songwriter Cynthia Roque) and Vice Ganda's “Boom Panes,” “Karakaraka,” “Push Mo Yan Teh” and “Wag Kang Pabebe” were all massive hits. He also penned "Ngayong Alam Ko Na" by Liezel Garcia and "Now We’re Together" by Bailey May of Now United. Rox's work with Padilla's albums (namely "DJP," "I Heart You," and "I Feel Good") were all certified.

Santos would also write songs for movies, television shows, and TV commercials. He wrote and produced "Akin Ka Na Lang" for local television drama "My Illegal Wife," "Karakaraka" for the film "Bromance" starring Zanjoe Marudo and the theme for "The Amazing Praybeyt Benjamin." He is behind the theme songs for "Annaliza," "The Love Story of Kang Chi," "Pretty Man," and "I Do" among others. Santos was named  label head of the new Star Music sub-label called StarPop. Artists in said label includes Loisa Andalio, Maymay Entrata, Edward Barber, Patrick Quiroz, Ylona Garcia, Kyle Echarri, Maris Racal, Mccoy de Leon, Elisse Joson, Kisses Delavin, Rayt Carreon, Chard Ocampo, Andrea Brillantes, Vivoree Esclito, and the music and dance group The Hashtags.

Discography

Songwriter Discography

Songs Written For Movies
 Boom Panes by Vice Ganda co-written with Vice Ganda and Jonathan Manalo (Star Cinema)
 Push Mo Yan Te by Vice Ganda) 
 Karakaraka by Vice Ganda feat Smugglaz (Star Cinema)
 Aking Ka Na Lang by Vice Ganda (Star Cinema)

Songs Written For Television
 Baby, I Do by Juris Fernandez
 ANNALIZA by Roel Manlangit and Liezel Garcia
 Sabay Natin by Daniel Padilla
 Ikaw Na Nga Yata by Kathryn Bernardo
 Ikaw Na Nga Yata Co-written by Christine Daria Estabillo and Vehnee Saturno
 Sana Ngayon Lang Ang Kahapon by Angeline Quinto
 Ngayong Alam Ko Na by Liezel Gracia
 Buhay Ko'y Ikaw by Vina Morales
 Bonggacious by Pokwang
 Kagandahan by Bea Alonzo

Albums Produced Under Star Music PH 
 May Bukas Pa - Soundtrack
 Liezel Garcia - Debut Album
 K-la - Debut Album
 Khalil Ramos - Debut Albun
 Daniel Padilla - Debut album
 Vice Ganda - Debut Album
 DJP - Daniel Padilla
 Vice Ganda - Trending Album
 Enchong Dee - Debut Album
 I Heart You - Daniel Padilla
 Enchong Dee - EDM Album
 Ai Ai De Las Alas - ADA Album
 Kathryn Bernardo - Debut Album
 I Feel Good - Daniel Padilla
 Christmas Love Duets - Daniel Padilla & Kathryn Bernardo
 Love Songs From Princess And I - Various Artists
 Got To Believe Soundtrack - Various Artists
 Bryan Termulo - Debut Album
 Xian Lim - Debut Album
 Xian Lim - XL2 album
 Richard Yap - Debut Album
 Kim Chiu -Chinita Princess Album
 Jovit Baldivino - JB - Jukebox
 Tanya - Debut Album
 Jolina Magdangal - Back To Love
 Ylona Garcia - My Name Is Ylona Garcia
 Michael Pangilinan - Michael
 Richard Yap and Richard Poon - Richard x Richard Album
 Vina Morales - Vina XXX
 Daniel Padilla - DJ Greatest Hits
 Karla Estrada - Karla Estrada Album
 Kaye Cal - Kaye Cal Debut Album
 Yohan Hwang - Debut Album
 Awra - Debut Album
 Klarisse De Guzman - Klarisse 
 Volts Vallejo - Debut Album
 Migz Haleco - Debut Album
 Agsunta - Debut Album
 Kim Chiu - Touch Of Your Love

Albums Produced Under Starpop 
 Kisses Delavin - Debut Album
 Elisse Joson & Mccoy De Leon - Mclisse Album 
 Patrick Quiroz - Debut Album
 Kyle Echarri - Debut Album
 Maris Racal - Stellar Album 
 Loisa Andalio - Debut Album 
 Belle Mariano - Daylight

References

Living people
1985 births
Filipino record producers
Filipino songwriters